Extra-low voltage (ELV) is an electricity supply voltage and is a part of the Low voltage band in a range which carries a low risk of dangerous electrical shock. There are various standards that define extra-low voltage. The International Electrotechnical Commission (IEC) and the UK IET (BS 7671:2008) define an ELV device or circuit as one in which the electrical potential between two conductors or between an electrical conductor and earth (ground) does not exceed 50V AC or 120V DC (ripple free).

The IEC and IET go on to define actual types of extra-low voltage systems, for example separated extra-low voltage (SELV), protected extra-low voltage (PELV), functional extra-low voltage (FELV). These can be supplied using sources including motor / fossil fuel generator sets, transformers, switched PSU's or rechargeable battery. SELV, PELV, FELV, are distinguished by various safety properties, supply characteristics and design voltages.

Some types of landscape lighting use SELV / PELV (extra-low voltage) systems. Modern battery operated hand tools fall in the SELV category. In more arduous conditions 25 volts RMS alternating current / 60 volts (ripple-free) direct current can be specified to further reduce hazard. Lower voltage can apply in wet or conductive conditions where there is even greater potential for electric shock. These systems should still fall under the SELV / PELV (ELV) safety specifications.

Types

Separated or safety extra-low voltage (SELV)
IEC defines a SELV system as "an electrical system in which the voltage cannot exceed ELV under normal conditions, and under single-fault conditions, including earth faults in other circuits". It is generally accepted that the acronym: SELV stands for separated extra-low voltage (separated from earth) as defined in installation standards (e.g. BS 7671), though BS EN 60335 refers to it as safety extra-low voltage.

A SELV circuit must have:
 Electrical protective-separation (i.e., double insulation, reinforced insulation or protective screening) from all circuits other than SELV and PELV (i.e., all circuits that might carry higher voltages)
 Simple separation from other SELV systems, from PELV systems and from earth (ground)

The safety of a SELV circuit is provided by
 The extra-low voltage
 The low risk of accidental contact with a higher voltage
 The lack of a return path through earth (ground) that electric current could take in case of contact with a human body

The design of a SELV circuit typically involves an isolating transformer, guaranteed minimum distances between conductors and electrical insulation barriers.  The electrical connectors of SELV circuits should be designed such that they do not mate with connectors commonly used for non-SELV circuits.

Typical examples for a SELV circuit: decorative out-door lighting, Class III battery charger, fed from a Class II power supply. Modern cordless hand tools are considered SELV equipment.

Protected extra-low voltage (PELV)
IEC 61140 defines a PELV system as "an electrical system in which the voltage cannot exceed ELV under normal conditions, and under single-fault conditions, except earth faults in other circuits".

A PELV circuit only requires protective-separation from all circuits other than SELV and PELV (i.e., all circuits that might carry higher voltages), but it may have connections to other PELV systems and earth (ground).

In contrast to a SELV circuit, a PELV circuit can have a protective earth (ground) connection. A PELV circuit, just as with SELV, requires a design that guarantees a low risk of accidental contact with a higher voltage. For a transformer, this can mean that the primary and secondary windings must be separated by reinforced insulation, or by a conductive shield with a protective earth connection, or that the secondary winding itself has an earthed terminal, so that any primary to secondary fault will cause automatic disconnection.
(The principle of double fault to danger requires either basic and additional insulation to fail or basic insulation and the connection to the protective earth to fail simultaneously before danger arises.)

A typical example for a PELV circuit is a metal cased computer with a Class I power supply.

Functional extra-low voltage (FELV)
The term functional extra-low voltage (FELV) describes any other extra-low-voltage circuit that does not fulfill the requirements for an SELV or PELV circuit. Although the FELV part of a circuit uses an extra-low voltage, it is not adequately protected from accidental contact with higher voltages in other parts of the circuit. Therefore, the protection requirements for the higher voltage have to be applied to the entire circuit.

Examples for FELV circuits include those that generate an extra low voltage through a semiconductor device or a potentiometer or an autotransformer. A typical example is an electronically controlled toaster where the electronic timer circuit runs off an extra low voltage derived from a tap on the heating element. Another might be ELV signalling between mains powered smoke alarms, with the signalling voltage referred to supply neutral.
In such cases the extra low voltage parts must be enclosed or insulated as to the standard of the mains voltage.

UK Reduced low voltage (RLV)
The IET / BSI (BS 7671) also define Reduced Low Voltage (RLV) which can be either single-phase or three-phase AC This system has been used for many years on construction sites, in both single- and three-phase configurations. The single-phase voltage is 110V a.c. though having a "centre tapped Earth" reducing the voltage to earth to 55V AC. The three-phase system is 110V phase-to-phase and 63V to neutral / earth. This system voltage is slightly above the ELV limit, but is still very commonly used for cord-powered hand tools and temporary lighting in hazardous areas. As it is transformer-derived, the exposed voltage during an earth fault is depressed below the ELV level.

Stand-alone power systems
Cabling for ELV systems, such as in remote-area power systems (RAPS), is designed to minimise energy losses while maximising safety. Lower voltages require a higher current for the same power. The higher current results in greater resistive losses in the cabling. Cable sizing must therefore consider maximum demand, voltage drop over the cable, and current-carrying capacity. Voltage drop is usually the main factor considered, but current-carrying capacity is as important when considering short, high-current runs such as between a battery bank and inverter.

Arcing is a risk in DC ELV systems, and some fuse types which can cause undesired arcing include semi-enclosed, rewireable and automotive fuse types. Instead high rupturing capacity fuses and appropriately rated circuit breakers are the recommended type for RAPS. Cable termination and connections must be done properly to avoid arcing also, and soldering is not recommended.

Regulations
Precise definitions of "extra low voltage" are given in applicable wiring regulations in a region.

EU
According to DIN EN 61140:2016 chapter 4.2 Table 1 (German version of EU standard EN 61140), Extra Low Voltage (≤ 50 V a.c. or ≤ 120 V d.c.) is defined as a sub-category of Low voltage (≤ 1000 V a.c. or ≤ 1500 V d.c.).
This is similar to the definition provided in IEC 61140:2016. 

The European Union directives on the other hand do not define extra-low voltage. The nearest they get to this concept is in the Low Voltage Directive (2014/35/EU), which applies to the range between 50V AC / 75V DC and 1,000V AC / 1,500V DC. The General Product Safety Directive (2001/95/EC) covers consumer goods with a voltage below 50 V for alternating current, or below 75 V for direct current. The directive only covers electrical equipment and not voltages appearing inside equipment or voltages in electrical components.

IEC
IEC 61140:2016, Basic safety publication defines ELV as ≤ 50V AC (RMS) and ≤ 120V DC ripple-free.

IEC 60364-4-41:2017, Group safety publication defines ELV as ≤ 50V AC (RMS) and ≤ 120V DC ripple-free.

Australia and New Zealand

AS/NZS 3000 Wiring Rules define "extra low voltage" as "Not exceeding 50V AC or 120V ripple-free DC" However, AS/ACIF S009 Clause 3.1.78.1 Extra-Low Voltage (ELV)states: "a voltage not exceeding 42.4V peak or 60V DC [AS/NZS 60950.1:2003]" and adds a note: "This definition differs from the ELV definition contained in AS/NZS 3000:2000" which is more closely aligned to the Telecommunications Network Voltage (TNV) limits ... i.e. 120V DC or 70.7V AC peak (50V AC RMS)" which accommodates telephone ringing voltage on the nominally −48V DC battery supply which could be encountered on a telephone line and was not considered hazardous, whereas 120V AC without current limiting at its source can inject 115mA into individuals leading to fibrillation of the heart.

Brazil
In Brazil, ELV (Extra-baixa tensão or EBT in Portuguese) is officially defined in Regulatory Standard no. 10 from the Brazilian Ministry of Labor and Employment as any voltage "not exceeding 50 volts a.c. or 120 volts d.c.". Although that standard defines safety rules for electricity, the Regulatory Standard no. 12 requires an even lower voltage for start and stop devices on machines and equipment made from March 2012 and on, stating it shall not exceed 25 volts AC or 60 volts DC

References

External links
 Electrical Safety chapter from Lessons In Electric Circuits Vol 1 DC book and series.

Voltage
Electric power
Electrical safety